Lancaster County Courthouse may refer to a building in the United States:

Lancaster County Courthouse (Pennsylvania)
Lancaster County Courthouse (South Carolina)